Bernard Lutic (26 November 1943 – 28 November 2000) was a French cinematographer. Lutic died in a plane crash in Venezuela.

Selected filmography

External links
 

1943 births
2000 deaths
French cinematographers
Victims of aviation accidents or incidents in Venezuela